Lucie Bigelow Rosen (June 28, 1890 –  November 27, 1968) was an American Theremin soloist known for popularizing the use of the instrument in the 1930s and 1940s, and a founder, along with her husband, Walter Tower Rosen, of the Caramoor festival.

Life
Lucie Bigelow Dodge was born in  Bernardsville, New Jersey in 1890, and married the lawyer and banker Walter Tower Rosen in 1914. They shared a common passion in art and culture, especially Italian, making frequent European trips and  collecting works of art for their Caramoor estate that they developed from 1929 to 1939.

By 1930 Lucie was part of a ten-person theremin ensemble rehearsing for their debut at the Carnegie Hall with Leon Theremin. Sometime afterward, the Rosens offered Theremin the use of their 37 West Fifty-fourth Street townhouse at low rent. By 1938 Leon Theremin needed money to return to Russia and, according to the Rosen's daughter Anne Stern, Walter offered him ten thousand dollars to create a new machine for Lucie together with all technical papers and rights to produce more for personal use only.

After Walter died in 1951, Lucie expanded the musical performances they had both started in 1940 into the Caramoor festival. She died in New York City in 1968.

Family
Her parents were Flora Bigelow and Charles Stuart Dodge; they divorced in 1902 and Flora was given custody of Lucie and her brother John Bigelow Dodge.  She  remarried  to Lionel Guest, a cousin of Winston Churchill and moved to Canada and later to London.  Lucie's paternal grandfather was Charles C. Dodge who was a brigadier-general during the American Civil War and had married Maria Theresa Schieffelin, daughter of Bradhurst Schieffelin.  Her great-grandfather was William E. Dodge who helped found Phelps Dodge & Co and secured the family wealth.  Her maternal grandfather was John Bigelow husband of Jane Tunis Poultney.

In 1913 Lucie disappeared from her mother's home in London, resulting in a much publicized search involving Scotland Yard.  She was discovered six days later living in London's West End theatre district.  She returned home but soon after moved to New York and married Rosen. They had two children, Anne and Walter; he was killed in 1944 on a bombing mission in England whilst serving with the Royal Canadian Air Force.

References

External links

 Lucy Rosen's 1940's Theremin Notebook
 Bohuslav Martinů and Lucie Rosen: the Path to Fantasia for Theremin
 Lucy Bigelow Rosen interview 1938 (restored) 2 minutes 38 seconds radio interview linked from 

Caramoor Center for Music and the Arts website

1890 births
1968 deaths
Musicians from New Jersey
American patrons of music
People from Bernardsville, New Jersey
Dodge family
Theremin players
American women in electronic music
20th-century American musicians